The Vice Governor of Cebu is the presiding officer of the Sangguniang Panlalawigan, the legislature of the provincial government of Cebu, Philippines.

The current vice governor is Hilario Davide III, under Liberal Party. He previously served as Governor of Cebu for two consecutive terms from 2013 to 2019 and was a member of the City Council representing Cebu City's North District from 2004 to 2007 and again from 2007 to 2010.

History 
On June 18, 1898, then President Emilio Aguinaldo promulgated a decree delegating Julio A. Llorente and Segundo Singson as Vice Governor of the Cebu province.

From an appointive position, the office of the Vice Governor become an elective post. The first election to vote for the Vice Governor was conducted in 1959 where Francisco Remotigue won, becoming the first elected Cebu Vice Governor.

List of Vice Governors of Cebu 
The following is the list of past and incumbent Cebu Vice Governors:

See also 
 List of governors of Cebu
 Cebu Provincial Board

References 

Politicians from Cebu
Vice Governors of Cebu
Cebu
Politics of Cebu